Call Us What We Carry is a poetry collection by Amanda Gorman, published December 7, 2021 by Viking Press. The book landed the first position on the New York Times Best Seller List.

Audiobook 
An accompanying audiobook version of Call Us What We Carry, read by Gorman, was released on December 7, 2021 by Penguin Random House's audio publishing division. The audiobook earned Gorman a nomination at the 65th Annual Grammy Awards in the newly-created Best Spoken Word Poetry Album category.

Reception 
Call Us What We Carry landed the first position on the New York Times Best Seller List and is an IndieBound best seller.

The book received starred reviews from Kirkus, as well as positive reviews from New York Times Book Review, The Washington Post, NPR, The Associated Press, Oprah Magazine, The Guardian, Tatler, and Publishers Weekly.

References 

2021 poetry books
Viking Press books